Chaetostomella completa is a species of tephritid or fruit flies in the genus Chaetostomella of the family Tephritidae.

Distribution
India, Nepal.

References

Tephritinae
Insects described in 1979
Diptera of Asia